Juliana, Countess of Stolberg-Wernigerode (15 February 1506 in Stolberg, Saxony-Anhalt – 18 June 1580) was the mother of William the Silent,  the leader of the successful Dutch Revolt against the Spanish in the 16th century.

Juliana was born in Stolberg as the daughter of Bodo VIII, Count of Stolberg-Wernigerode and Anna of Eppstein-Königstein. She was raised a Roman Catholic but changed her religion twice, first to Lutheranism and later to Calvinism. She, along with her second husband, was a convinced Protestant and raised their children in the Protestant ways. After the death of her second husband in 1559 she remained living at Dillenburg castle, now belonging to her second son John, where she died in 1580.

Her entire life, she kept close to her children, especially William. When William began his rebellion against Philip II of Spain she supported her son morally and financially. Because of this financial support, William was able to campaign against Spain in the Netherlands.

A fictionalized account of her life is found in Ethel Herr, Dr. Oma: The Healing Wisdom of Countess Juliana Von Stolberg (P&R Publishing, 2006).

Marriages and children

In 1523 Juliana married Philip II of Hanau-Münzenberg (d. 1529). From this marriage five children were born:

 Reinhard (born: 10 April 1524; died 12 April 1524)
 Catherine (born: 26 March 1525; died 20 August 1581), married John IV, Count of Wied-Runkel and Isenburg
 Philip III (1526–1561), Count of Hanau-Münzenberg
 Reinhard (born: 8 April 1528; died: 11 October 1554), halfbrother of William of Orange, he died in battle in service of the army of Charles V in the war against France.
 Juliana (born: 30 March 1529; died: 8 July 1595), married Thomas, Wild- and Rhinegrave of Salm-Kyrburg (1529–1549)

On 20 September 1531 Juliana married William I, Count of Nassau-Siegen. From this marriage twelve children were born:

 William I of Orange (1533–1584),
 Hermanna (1534  – † young)
 John VI "the Elder" (1536–1606)
 Louis of Nassau (1538–1574)
 Maria (1539–1599) She married William IV, Count of Berg
 Adolf (1540–1568)
 Anna (1541–1616). She married Albert of Nassau-Weilburg
 Elisabeth (1542–1603). She married Conrad, Count of Solms-Braunfels
 Catherine (1543–1624). She married Count Günther XLI of Schwarzburg-Arnstadt
 Juliana (1546–1588). She married Count Albrecht VII of Schwarzburg-Rudolstadt
 Magdalena (1547–1633). She married Count Wolfgang of Hohenlohe-Weikersheim
 Henry (1550–1574)

Juliana of Stolberg had in total 17 children and 123 grandchildren.

See also
List of people with the most children

References 

1506 births
Countesses of Nassau
1580 deaths
People from Stolberg, Saxony-Anhalt
German Calvinist and Reformed Christians
House of Hanau
House of Nassau
German people of the Eighty Years' War
House of Stolberg
William the Silent
Converts to Calvinism from Lutheranism